Philipp Zulechner (born 12 April 1990) is an Austrian professional footballer who last played as a forward for Odd.

Club career
In January 2014, Zulechner moved to Germany and signed for Bundesliga side Freiburg.

In January 2015, after a year with Freiburg, he returned to his native Austria and joined Austria Wien on loan for the remainder of the season. Austria Wien had the option to extend the loan for another year as well as to sign him on a permanent basis.

On 8 December 2015, it was announced that Zulechner would join Swiss Young Boys on loan effective 1 January 2016, the deal including an option for a permanent sign in July 2016.

On 31 August 2016, Zulechner joined Sturm Graz on a free transfer signing a two-year contract. He suffered from a staphylococcus infection, which led to him spending two weeks in a wheelchair. He left Sturm Graz at the end of the season.

Zulechner joined 2. Bundesliga club Erzgebirge Aue on 30 January 2019. In November 2019, he extended his contract with Aue until 2023. His contract with Aue was terminated in August 2021.

On 31 January 2022, Zulechner signed for 3. Liga club Hallescher FC. In the summer he moved on to Norwegian top-tier club Odd, but the stay became short-lived and he was released at the end of 2022.

International career
Zulechner made his senior international debut for the Austria on 19 November 2013 in a 1–0 victory in a friendly against the United States.

References

External links

1990 births
Living people
Association football forwards
Austrian footballers
Austria international footballers
Austrian Football Bundesliga players
2. Liga (Austria) players
Bundesliga players
Swiss Super League players
2. Bundesliga players
Eliteserien players
SV Horn players
SV Grödig players
SC Freiburg players
FK Austria Wien players
BSC Young Boys players
SK Sturm Graz players
FC Erzgebirge Aue players
Hallescher FC players
Odds BK players
Austrian expatriate footballers
Austrian expatriate sportspeople in Germany
Expatriate footballers in Germany
Austrian expatriate sportspeople in Switzerland
Expatriate footballers in Switzerland
Austrian expatriate sportspeople in Norway
Expatriate footballers in Norway